Attaea or Attaia was a city of Classical Anatolia in the region of the Caicus River or Lycus River. It minted coins inscribed "ΑΤΤΕΑΤΩΝ" from Caracalla's time simultaneously with those who have the legend "ΑΤΤΑΙΤΩΝ." It was also the site of a bishopric and was an important site for early Christianity. Attaea is today a titular see of the Roman Catholic Church in the ecclesiastical province of Ephesus. Attempts to equate it with the town called Attea by Strabo, located near the coast of ancient Mysia are not convincing. 

Known bishops
Fortunado Devoto  September 2, 1927   June 29, 1941  
 Eduardo Martinez González    March 29, 1942   December 14, 1950  
 Vitale Bonifacio Bertoli  April 5, 1951   March 10, 1967

References

Populated places in ancient Turkey
Former populated places in Turkey
Populated places of the Byzantine Empire
Dioceses in Asia
Catholic titular sees in Asia